The 2006 New Mexico Lobos football team represented the University of New Mexico during the 2006 NCAA Division I FBS football season. New Mexico competed as a member of the Mountain West Conference (MW), and played their home games in the University Stadium. The Lobos were led by ninth-year head coach Rocky Long.

Schedule

References

New Mexico
New Mexico Lobos football seasons
New Mexico Lobos football